Patrick Condren (born 1967) is an Irish actor, stunt professional, and a former Irish Heavyweight Kickboxing Champion. He was the first Irishman to be nominated at the Taurus World Stunt Awards following his work in the film, Intermission.

References

1967 births
Irish male film actors
Living people
Place of birth missing (living people)
Date of birth missing (living people)